Brief Rapture (Italian: Lebbra bianca) is a 1951 Italian drama film directed by Enzo Trapani and starring Amedeo Nazzari, Lois Maxwell and Umberto Spadaro. An Italian war veteran teams up with a police inspector to pursue the drug-dealing gang who have killed his sister.

It was shot at the SACI Studios in Rome.

Plot 
Stefano returns to Rome to look for Lucia, a sister he hasn't heard of for months now. Lucia works with a rich family, Stefano goes to the family and finds in Lucia's suitcase an address of a pension, when he arrives at the pension he meets Erika a foreign girl who is a friend of Lucia, but Erika has no information to give him. Stefano who has fallen in love with Erika goes with her to a dance hall where he works, when he arrives at the club he comes into contact with a gang of cocaine traffickers; discovering that Erika is their contact.  At this point Stefano goes to a clandestine gambling den and while there is a police raid he learns that Lucia has committed suicide in the Tiber. The traffickers responsible for Lucia's death, fearful of retaliation by Stefano, order Erika to kill him, Erika reveals everything to Stefano, and together they will face the traffickers.

Main cast
Amedeo Nazzari as Francesco Leverrier
Umberto Spadaro as Police chief 
Lois Maxwell as Erika
Ermanno Randi as Stefano Ferrari
Juan de Landa as Boss
Sophia Loren as A girl in the boardinghouse
Folco Lulli 
Silvio Bagolini as Gorini
Gilberto Mazzi as Alfonso
Massimo Sallusti as Carlo

References

Bibliography
 Piero Pruzzo & Enrico Lancia. Amedeo Nazzari. Gremese Editore, 1983.

External links
 

1951 films
1950s Italian-language films
Italian drama films
1951 drama films
Films directed by Enzo Trapani
Films set in Rome
Italian black-and-white films
1950s Italian films